Mount Tiedemann 3838m (12592 feet), prominence 848m, is one of the principal summits of the Pacific Ranges subdivision of the Coast Mountains of British Columbia.

Name origin
Mount Tiedemann is named for Herman Otto Tiedemann, who worked for the colonial government under Surveyor-General Joseph Pemberton, designing and supervising construction of Victoria, British Columbia's "Birdcages", the original legislature buildings there, the former courthouse (now the Maritime Museum), the Fisgard Lighthouse and other buildings and churches, all while conducting surveys of the British Columbia and Alaska coast.  He was responsible for first bringing water from Elk Lake to the city as a water supply.

In 1862, he had accompanied Alfred Waddington on preliminary surveys for the proposed wagon road to the Cariboo goldfields via Bute Inlet and the Homathko River, the demise of which project came with the opening events of the Chilcotin War of 1864.  Tiedmann Creek, which flows from the Tiedemann Glacier eastwards to the Homathko, was so-named by himself because he had fallen into it and nearly died.

Climbing history
The first ascent was in 1939 by Sterling Hendricks, Hans Fuhrer, E.R. Gibson, Henry S. Hall via the Chaos Glacier to the North Aréte.

Climate
Based on the Köppen climate classification, Mount Tiedemann has an ice cap climate. Most weather fronts originate in the Pacific Ocean, and travel east toward the Coast Mountains where they are forced upward by the range (Orographic lift), causing them to drop their moisture in the form of rain or snowfall. As a result, the Coast Mountains experience high precipitation, especially during the winter months in the form of snowfall. Temperatures can drop below −20 °C with wind chill factors  below −30 °C. This climate supports the Chaos, Radiant and Tiedemann glaciers which surround the slopes of Mount Tiedemann.

References

External links
 Weather: Mount Tiedemann
 Mount Tiedemann (aerial photo): PBase

Landforms of the Chilcotin
Three-thousanders of British Columbia
Waddington Range
Range 2 Coast Land District